Cleveland Abbe (December 3, 1838 – October 28, 1916) was an American meteorologist and advocate of time zones.

While director of the Cincinnati Observatory in Cincinnati, Ohio, he developed a system of telegraphic weather reports, daily weather maps, and weather forecasts. In 1870, Congress established the U.S. Weather Bureau and inaugurated the use of daily weather forecasts. In recognition of his work, Abbe, who was often referred to as "Old Probability" for the reliability of his forecasts, was appointed the first head of the new service.

Early life
Cleveland Abbe was born in New York City and grew up in the prosperous merchant family of George Waldo and Charlotte Colgate Abbe. One of his younger brothers, Robert, became a prominent surgeon and radiologist. In school, Cleveland excelled in mathematics and chemistry, attending David B. Scott Grammar School, and graduating in 1857 from the Free Academy with a Bachelor of Arts. While at City College, he learned under Oliver Wolcott Gibbs. He tutored mathematics at the Trinity Latin School in New York City in 1857 and 1858. He then taught engineering, as an assistant professor at the University of Michigan in 1859, followed by a tutoring job, also in engineering, until he left in 1860. During this stay in Michigan, he also was studying astronomy under Franz Brünnow from 1858 to 1859. He received his second degree, a Master of Arts in 1860, from City College. When the Civil War broke out, he tried to join the Union Army; however, he failed the vision test, due to myopia, and spent the war years in Cambridge, Massachusetts, attending Harvard, and working as an assistant to Benjamin Gould, astronomer and head of the Longitude Department of the United States Coast Survey. He received his Bachelor of Science degree from Harvard in 1864, which also marked the end of his working at the US Coast Survey. It was while in Cambridge that he rubbed shoulders with scientists from the Nautical Almanac, specifically, William Ferrel, which probably piqued his meteorological curiosity. He then studied abroad in Russia at the Observatory of Pulkovo, as a guest, and returned, in 1866, to the U.S. eager to study astronomy. It was said that he was his happiest while in Russia as he was surrounded by like-minded intellectuals, formed a relationship with Otto Struve, and enjoyed the scenery. His first job in astronomy as at the United States Naval Observatory until he was offered the director position at the Cincinnati Observatory, in 1868, by the Cincinnati Astronomical Society. He spent a few years in Cincinnati, but his interests were already evolving. Remembering that meteorological conditions directly affected the work of astronomers, he began working in the field of meteorology. He won approval to report on and predict the weather, working on the premise that forecasts could and should be generated at minimal expense and in such a way as to perhaps even produce income. By 1873 he was let go by the Cincinnati Observatory due to funding issues and it was then that he made the decision that would change his career path.

Meteorological career

His first work on weather was centered on forecasting and issuance of warnings for severe weather. This preliminary work was started while still in Cincinnati. His first bulletin was issued on 1 September 1869. Abbe was appointed chief meteorologist at the United States Weather Bureau on 3 January 1871, which at the time was part of the Signal Corps. One of the first things that he addressed was the forecasting dimension of meteorology. He recognized that predicting the weather required a widespread, yet coordinated team. And so with short-term funding granted from the Cincinnati Chamber of Commerce, he enlisted twenty volunteer weather observers to help report conditions. Western Union agreed to permit the observers to communicate without charge, and Abbe and his team went to work. He selected data-collecting instruments that would be critical to the success of weather predicting, and he trained Army observer sergeants in their use. Field data was transmitted using code designed to minimize word count, and at the designated times, information flooded the transmission stations. Clerks would then decode and record the messages and manually enter data onto weather maps, which were then used to predict the weather.

On February 19, 1871, Abbe personally gave the first official weather report. He continued to forecast alone for the next six months, while simultaneously training others. He was joined in mid-1871 by two Army lieutenants and a civilian professor in giving reports, and the team was then able to rotate the heavy workload. Abbe demanded precise language in the forecasts and ensured that every forecast covered four key meteorological elements: weather (clouds and precipitation), temperature, wind direction, and barometric pressure. By the end of the first year of reporting, over 60 copies of weather charts had been sent to Congress, the press, and various scientific institutions. By 1872, Abbe regularly sent over 500 sets of daily maps and bulletins overseas in exchange for European meteorological data. Abbe also insisted on verifying predictions. During the first year of operation, in 1871, Abbe and his staff verified 69 percent of their predictions; the annual report apologized for the other 31 percent, citing the time constraints as the cause.

Abbe founded and was the initial editor of the Monthly Weather Review in 1872. He also was the editor from 1892 until 1915 (just before his death). The Mount Weather Observatory in Virginia also produced a weather bulletin, of which Abbe was the editor from 1909 to 1913.

In order to compile his information, Abbe required a time-keeping system that was consistent among the stations. To accomplish this he divided the United States into four standard time zones. He published, in 1879, a paper titled Report on Standard Time. In 1883, he convinced North American railroad companies to adopt his time-zone system. In 1884, Britain, which had already adopted its own standard time system for England, Scotland, and Wales, helped gather international consent for global time. In time, the American government, influenced in part by his 1879 paper, adopted the time-zone system.

Abbe required that the weather service stay at the forefront of technology. Over time, the instrument division at the headquarters tested and calibrated thousands of devices and even began to design and build their own instruments. By the end of the century, self-registering equipment came into use, and the United States led the meteorological world with 114 Class I (automatic recording) observation stations. Anticipating an increase in international cooperation, Abbe began to seek quality instruments calibrated to international standards. He enlisted Oliver Wolcott Gibbs of Harvard and Arthur Wright of Yale to design improved equipment. For comparison purposes, Abbe ordered a barometer from Heinrich Wild (director of the Nicholas Central Observatory in Russia), as well as an anemometer and several types of hygrometers from Germany. Abbe then invented an anemobarometer to test the effect of chimney and window drafts on barometers in enclosed spaces.

Abbe returned to academia in 1886, when he accepted a professorship at Columbian University, where he taught meteorology and remained until 1905. He was a regular lecturer at Johns Hopkins from 1896 through 1914. He has authored nearly 300 scientific papers. He was the recipient of three honorary degrees. His original school of higher learning, the City College of New York awarded him a PhD in 1891, in 1888 the University of Michigan gave Abbe an LL D as did the University of Glasgow in 1896. Harvard University gave him the S.B. degree in 1900.

Abbe was elected as a member of the American Philosophical Society in 1871. Associate Fellow of the American Academy of Arts and Sciences in 1884. In 1912 the Royal Meteorological Society presented him with their Symons Gold Medal, citing his contribution "to instrumental, statistical, dynamical, and thermo dynamical meteorology and forecasting." In 1916 he was awarded the Public Welfare Medal from the National Academy of Sciences, which also gave him the Marcellus Hartley Medal. He was also one of the 33 founders of the National Geographic Society.

Abbe died in 1916 after more than 45 years of outstanding scientific achievement. He was buried in Rock Creek Cemetery in Washington, DC. Abbe enjoyed ethnology, oriental archaeology, geology, botany, and music in his off time.

Monthly Weather Review

Cleveland Abbe founded the scientific journal Monthly Weather Review in 1872.  The Monthly Weather Review began as a government publication under the United States Army Signal Corps. In 1891, the Signal Office's meteorological responsibilities were transferred to the Weather Bureau under the United States Department of Agriculture. The Weather Bureau published the review until 1970, when the bureau became part of the newly formed National Oceanic and Atmospheric Administration. NOAA published the review until the end of 1973. Since 1974, this well-respected scientific journal has been published by the American Meteorological Society.

Timeline

Selected writings
His publications include:

Notes

References

Sources

Further reading

External links

 Cleveland Abbe Papers, 1850-1954 at the Library of Congress Manuscripts Division. The Library of Congress holds Abbe's papers, which document his professional activities and avocational interest in genealogy. The collection includes a number of the earliest maps that Abbe constructed in 1870, showing the current state of weather conditions over the United States based on telegraphic reports of conditions in various locations throughout the country.
 George P. Merrill Correspondence and Autographs, 1803-1926
 Othniel Charles Marsh Papers, 1817-1899
 William W. Coblentz Papers, 1883-1960
 Abbe and the eclipse of 1878
 National Academy of Sciences Biographical Memoir
 

1838 births
1916 deaths
American meteorologists
American science writers
Fellows of the American Academy of Arts and Sciences
Members of the United States National Academy of Sciences
Meteorology in history
National Geographic Society founders
Scientists from New York City
University of Michigan faculty
Weather forecasting
Harvard School of Engineering and Applied Sciences alumni
National Weather Service people
Burials at Rock Creek Cemetery
City College of New York alumni